Acronicta pulverosa is a moth of the family Noctuidae. It is found in the Korean Peninsula, China, Japan (Honshu, Shikoku, Kyushu, Tsushima Island) and Taiwan.

External links
Korean Insects

Acronicta
Moths of Asia
Moths described in 1909